Taslanizing or taslanising is a process for making air-textured yarns.  Taslan is an expired registered trademark of DuPont for this process, first registered on October 19, 1954. In German the word is Luftex. The process is simply feeding a bundle of continuous filament yarns into a small jet nozzle with various amounts of slack (overfeed). High pressure air ( > 100 PSI ) creates a suction and a turbulent airstream which tangles any slack into a yarn with a similar hand as a spun yarn. It is the turbulent airflow that tangles the fibers. This method of yarn productions creates a yarn that is normally more even than a spun yarn and does not pill like a spun yarn.

Taslan is also a name for yarn made using this process.

References 

Fibers
Yarn